This article contains information about the literary events and publications of 1723.

Events
March – Voltaire makes an agreement with Abraham Viret to allow his work to be printed in Rouen.
July – A new edition of Bernard Mandeville's The Fable of the Bees is presented as a public nuisance by the Grand Jury of Middlesex, England, to the Court of King's Bench. Mandeville escapes prosecution.
November – After attending a party at the home of the marquis des Maisons, Voltaire contracts smallpox.
unknown date – The book collection of Samuel Pepys (died 1703), including his Diary, is transferred to the Pepys Library at his alma mater, Magdalene College, Cambridge, in accordance with his will.

New books

Fiction
Penelope Aubin – The Life of Charlotta Du Pont, an English lady; taken from her own memoirs
Jane Barker – A Patch-Work Screen for the Ladies
Thomas-Simon Gueullette – Les Aventures merveilleuses du mandarin Fum-Hoam, contes chinois (The Transmigrations of the Mandarin Fum-Hoam (Chinese Tales))
Eliza Haywood – Idalia: Or, the Unfortunate Mistress. A Novel. Written by Mrs. Eliza Haywood
Anton Josef Kirchweger – Aurea Catena Homeri
Margrethe Lasson – Den beklædte Sandhed (first novel in Danish)
John Sheffield, Duke of Buckingham (died 1721) – The Works of John Sheffield, Earl of Mulgrave, Marquis of Normanby, and Duke of Buckingham

Drama
Elijah Fenton – Mariamne
 Francis Hawling – The Impertinent Lovers
Eliza Haywood – A Wife to be Let
Ludvig Holberg – Erasmus Montanus
Hildebrand Jacob – The Fatal Constancy
Charles Johnson – Love in a Forest (adapted from As You Like It)
Pierre de Marivaux – La Double Inconstance
Ambrose Philips – Humphrey, Duke of Gloucester
 Jane Robe – The Fatal Legacy
Richard Savage – Sir Thomas Overbury

Poetry

Sir Richard Blackmore – Alfred: an epick poem
Heyat Mahmud – Jangnama; Bengali
David Mallet – William and Margaret
William Meston – Knight of the Kirk
Ambrose Philips – Ode on the Death of William, Earl of Cowper
Matthew Prior
Down-Hall
The Turtle and the Sparrow
Allan Ramsay – The Tea-Table Miscellany, Vol. 1
Voltaire – La Henriade
Ned Ward – Nuptial Dialogues and Debates, 3rd ed.

Non-fiction
James Anderson – The Constitutions of the Free-Masons
Henry Baker – An Invocation of Health: a poem
Offspring Blackall, Bishop of Exeter (posthumously) – Collected Works
Pietro Giannone – Storia civile del regno di Napoli (History of the Kingdom of Naples)
Bernard de Mandeville – A Search into the Nature of Society
Thomas Dempster (posthumous) – De Etruria regali libri VII (printed in sans-serif)
Thomas Gordon and John Trenchard – Cato's Letters (essays)
John Nott – The Cooks and Confectioners Dictionary or, the Accomplish'd Housewives Companion

Births
January 21 (or June 21) – Baron d'Holbach, German-born French philosopher and encyclopedist (died 1789)
February 23 – Richard Price, Welsh-born philosopher (died 1791)
February 24 – John Burgoyne, English soldier and dramatist (died 1792)
June 5 (baptized) – Adam Smith, Scottish economist (died 1790)
June 20 – Adam Ferguson, Scottish philosopher and historian (died 1816)
July 11 – Jean-François Marmontel, French novelist and dramatist (died 1799)
September 30 – William Hutton, English local historian and poet (died 1815)
November 8 – John Byron, English vice-admiral and memoirist (died 1786)
November 30 – William Livingston, American political writer and politician (died 1790)
December 26 – Friedrich Melchior, Baron von Grimm, German-born French philosopher and encyclopedist (died 1807)

Deaths

February 26 – Thomas d'Urfey, English dramatist (born 1653)
March 13 – René Auguste Constantin de Renneville, French Protestant poet and historian (born 1650)
March 15 – Johann Christian Günther, German poet (born 1695)
May 11 – Jean Galbert de Campistron, French dramatist (born 1656)
June 8 – Isaac Chayyim Cantarini, Italian poet, physician and preacher (born 1644)
July 28 – Mariana Alcoforado, Portuguese nun (born 1640)
August 21 – Dimitrie Cantemir, Romanian author (born 1673)
September 23 – Jacques Basnage, French Protestant poet, linguist and preacher (born 1653)
December 1 – Susanna Centlivre (Susanna Carroll), English dramatist (born c. 1667–70)
December 17 – John Trenchard, English politician and writer (born 1662)

References

 
Years of the 18th century in literature